The 2010 San Francisco Board of Supervisors elections were held on November 2, 2010. Five of the eleven seats of the San Francisco Board of Supervisors were contested in this election. Four incumbents were termed out of office, while one ran for reelection.

Municipal elections in California are officially non-partisan, though most candidates in San Francisco do receive funding and support from various political parties. The election was held using ranked-choice voting.

Results

District 2 

District 2 consists of the Marina, Pacific Heights, the Presidio, part of Russian Hill, and Sea Cliff. Incumbent supervisor Michela Alioto-Pier was termed out of office.

District 4 

District 4 consists primarily of the Sunset district. Incumbent supervisor Carmen Chu ran for reelection unopposed.

District 6 

District 6 consists of Alcatraz Island, Civic Center, Mission Bay, South of Market, the Tenderloin, Treasure Island, and Yerba Buena Island. Incumbent supervisor Chris Daly was termed out of office.

Ranked-choice vote distribution

District 8 

District 8 consists of The Castro, Diamond Heights, Duboce Triangle, Eureka Valley, Glen Park, and Noe Valley. Incumbent supervisor Bevan Dufty was termed out of office.

District 10 

District 10 consists of Bayview-Hunters Point, McLaren Park, part of the Portola, Potrero Hill, and Visitacion Valley. Incumbent supervisor Sophie Maxwell was termed out of office.

Ranked-choice vote distribution

References

External links 
San Francisco Department of Elections

San Francisco Board of Supervisors
Elections Board of Supervisors
San Francisco Board of Supervisors
Board of Supervisors 2010
San Francisco-related lists
2010s in San Francisco